Margulies (occasionally Margolyes) is a surname that, like its variants shown below, is derived from the Ashkenazi Hebrew pronunciation of the Hebrew word  (Israeli Hebrew ), meaning 'pearls,' and may refer to:

 Ben Margulies, songwriter and record producer
 David Margulies (1937–2016), American actor
 Donald Margulies, American playwright
 Jimmy Margulies, award-winning editorial cartoonist
 Joseph Margulies (artist) (1896–1984), a Vienna-born American painter and printmaker
 Joseph Margulies (lawyer), American attorney and law professor
 Julianna Margulies, (born 1966), American actress
 Lazar C. Margulies (1895–1982), physician and inventor of a type of Intrauterine device
 Leo Margulies, American editor and publisher
 Martin Margulies (born 1948), American musician/film producer better known as Johnny Legend
 Martin Margulies, real-estate developer and collector of contemporary art and photography
 Roni Margulies (born 1955), Turkish poet and activist
 Samuel Hirsch Margulies (1858–1922), rabbi and Jewish scholar
 Susan Margulies, American engineer and professor
 Miriam Margolyes (born 1941), British-Australian actress

See also 
 Margolies
 Margolin (disambiguation)
 Margolis
 Margules
 Margulis
 Margolus
 Margaliot

Jewish surnames
Hebrew-language surnames

Margulias